Adam Thomas, born 22 August 1986 in Ynysybwl, Wales, is a rugby union player for Pontypridd RFC in the Principality Premiership.

Thomas was drafted to the Pontypridd squad from his local Ynysybwl RFC club after having impressed the coaching staff during the Silver Ball cup final of 2005.

During the summer of 2009, Thomas flew to New Zealand to play for Waikaka White Star RFC, impressing the provincial staff enough to be called into the training squad for the Air New Zealand Cup team, Southland Rugby.

Thomas's position of choice is as a centre.

Thomas represented Wales in the 2013 Rugby World Cup Sevens.

References

External links
Pontypridd RFC profile

1986 births
Living people
Commonwealth Games rugby sevens players of Wales
Pontypridd RFC players
Rugby sevens players at the 2014 Commonwealth Games
Rugby union players from Ynysybwl
Welsh rugby union players